This page lists peer-reviewed scientific journals in the field of neuroscience.

A
 ACS Chemical Neuroscience
 Annals of Neurology
 Annual Review of Neuroscience
 Autonomic Neuroscience: Basic and Clinical

B

 Behavioral and Brain Functions
 Behavioral and Brain Sciences
 Behavioural Brain Research
 Biological Psychiatry
 Brain
 Brain Research

C
 Cerebral Cortex
 Current Opinion in Neurobiology

G
 Genes, Brain and Behavior

H
 Hippocampus
 Human Brain Mapping

J
 Journal of Cognitive Neuroscience
 Journal of Neuroimmunology
 The Journal of Neuroscience

N
 Nature Neuroscience
 Nature Reviews Neuroscience
 Neuron
 Neuroscience
 Neuropsychopharmacology
 Nutritional Neuroscience

neuroscience
Neuroscience j
Neuroscience journals